Badal Singh (born 29 October 1987) is an Indian-born cricketer who plays for the Oman national cricket team. In October 2018, he was named in Oman's squad for the 2018 ICC World Cricket League Division Three tournament in Oman. He played in Oman's final fixture of the tournament, against Uganda, on 18 November 2018. In March 2019, he was named in Oman's team for the 2019 ICC World Cricket League Division Two tournament in Namibia. In November 2019, he was named in Oman's squad for the 2019 ACC Emerging Teams Asia Cup in Bangladesh. The following month, he was named in Oman's One Day International (ODI) squad for the 2020 Oman Tri-Nation Series. He made his ODI debut for Oman, against Nepal, on 5 February 2020.

References

External links
 

1987 births
Living people
People from South Goa district
Goa cricketers
Cricketers from Goa
Omani cricketers
Oman One Day International cricketers
Indian emigrants to Oman
Indian expatriates in Oman